Vallenata could refer to:

 A feminine adjective to a person or object from the valley or city of Valledupar, in Colombia.
 The music genre Vallenato ("musica vallenata").
 A radio Station named La Vallenata part of the Colombian radio network Caracol Radio.